Dániel Mészáros (born 27 September 2004) is a Hungarian competitive swimmer. He is a 2022 European Aquatics Championships gold medalist in the 4×200-metre freestyle relay. At the 2022 World Junior Championships, he won a gold medal in the 4×100-metre mixed freestyle relay and silver medals in the 200-metre freestyle and 4×200-metre freestyle relay.

Background
Mészáros was born 27 September 2004 in Budapest and trains with Ferencvárosi TC swim club.

Career

2021–2022
At the 2021 European Junior Swimming Championships, held in July in Rome, Italy, Mészáros won a bronze medal in the 4×100-metre mixed freestyle relay, swimming the lead-off leg of the relay in the final in 50.43 seconds to contribute to the final mark of 3:31.85, and placed sixth in the 4×200-metre freestyle relay, ninth in the 4×100-metre medley relay, tenth in the 4×100-metre freestyle relay, 20th in the 400-metre freestyle, and 30th in the 200-metre individual medley. The following year, at the 2022 European Junior Swimming Championships held in July in Otopeni, Romania, he placed fourth in the 200-metre freestyle, with a time of 1:48.89 that equalled his personal best time in the event, placed sixth in the 4×200-metre freestyle relay, contributing to the final time of 7:24.64 with a lead-off time of 1:49.98, and placed seventh in the 400-metre freestyle with a time of 3:53.54.

2022 European Aquatics Championships

On the first day of swimming competition at the 2022 European Aquatics Championships, held in August at Foro Italico in Rome, Italy, Mészáros won a gold medal as part of the 4×200-metre freestyle relay, splitting a 1:49.48 for the seconds leg of the relay in the preliminary heats to help qualify the relay to the final ranking sixth, where the finals relay finished first in a time of 7:05.38. Three days later, on 14 August, he placed 28th in the 200-metre freestyle with a time of 1:50.60. For his final two events, he placed fourth in the 4×200-metre mixed freestyle relay with a final mark of 7:34.55, swimming on both the prelims relay and the finals relay on 16 August, and 26th in the 400-metre freestyle on 17 August with a time of 3:54.70.

2022 World Junior Championships

Starting his competition on day one of the 2022 FINA World Junior Swimming Championships, held starting 30 August in Lima, Peru, Mészáros swam on both the prelims and finals relays in the 4×100-metre freestyle relay, helping place fifth in the final in 3:20.59 by splitting a 49.55 for the anchor leg of the relay. The following day, he won the silver medal in the 200-metre freestyle with a time of 1:48.98, which was 2.80 seconds behind gold medalist David Popovici of Romania and 0.07 seconds ahead of bronze medalist Filippo Bertoni of Italy. The third day, he won a gold medal in the 4×100-metre mixed freestyle relay, contributing a lead-off time of 50.79 seconds to the final mark of 3:30.03 achieved by him and his finals relay teammates Benedek Bóna, Nikolett Pádár, and Dóra Molnár. On 2 September, he split a 1:48.01 for the fourth leg of the 4×200-metre freestyle relay in the final to help win the silver medal with a time of 7:17.55, which was less than half a second behind the gold medal-winning team from Italy. Day six of six, 4 September, he contributed a time of 51.10 seconds for the freestyle leg of the 4×100-metre medley relay in the preliminaries to help qualify the relay to the final ranking fifth before Benedek Bóna substituted in for him on the finals relay and the finals relay was disqualified for an early start by the second leg swimmer.

2022 Hungarian Short Course Championships
In November, at the 2022 Hungarian National Short Course Championships in Kaposvár, Mészáros  placed sixth in the final of the 400-metre freestyle on the first day of competition with a time of 3:47.99. The second day of competition, he followed up with a personal best time of 23.00 seconds in the 50-metre freestyle to place sixth in the b-final. In his final event, the 200-metre freestyle on day three, he achieved a personal best time of 1:45.40 in the final to place fifth, finishing 1.86 seconds behind gold medalist Kristóf Milák.

International championships (50 m)

 Mészáros swam only in the preliminary heats.
 Mészáros was not a member of the finals relay that was disqualified.

Personal best times

Long course metres (50 m pool)

Short course metres (25 m pool)

Legend: b – b-final

Awards and honours
 M4 Sport, Hungarian Youth Athletes Performance of the Year (individual sports, mixed team): 2022 (4×100-metre mixed freestyle relay at the 2022 World Junior Championships)

References

External links
 

2004 births
Living people
Swimmers from Budapest
Hungarian male swimmers
Hungarian male freestyle swimmers
European Aquatics Championships medalists in swimming
21st-century Hungarian people